Giuseppe Brizi (19 March 1942 – 9 June 2022) was an Italian professional football player and manager who played as a defender. In 2012, he was inducted into ACF Fiorentina Hall of Fame.

Player career
Brizi debuted in professional football during the 1959–60 Serie C season, when he played as a midfielder for Maceratese. In 1962, he was then bought by Fiorentina, where Ferruccio Valcareggi eventually decided to play him as a sweeper. In Florence, Brizi had his best spell of his career, making 389 appearances (becoming the player with the second highest number of appearances in the history of the club) and contributing to winning, among others, one Scudetto and two Coppa Italia.

He was part of the Italy national B team's's squad that won the 1963 Mediterranean Games.

Managerial career
Brizi was the manager of Maceratese for three non-consecutive tenures, where he won his Girone during the 1979–80 Serie D season, Lanciano, Fermana, and Sangiustese.

Honours

Player
Fiorentina
Serie A: 1968–69
Coppa Italia: 1965–66, 1974–75
Anglo-Italian League Cup: 1975
Mitropa Cup: 1966

Italy
Mediterranean Games: 1963

Individual
ACF Fiorentina Hall of Fame: 2012

References

External links
 Italo Bandini at ATF-Firenze.it
 

1942 births
2022 deaths
Italian footballers
Association football defenders
ACF Fiorentina players
S.S. Maceratese 1922 players
S.S. Virtus Lanciano 1924 managers
Competitors at the 1963 Mediterranean Games
Mediterranean Games competitors for Italy
People from Macerata